, shortened as The Bush Baby, is the title of a 1992 anime series consisting of forty 25-minute episodes. It is based on the novel The Bushbabies (1965) by Canadian author William Stevenson.

The series is part of Fuji Television and Nippon Animation's World Masterpiece Theater, which consists of anime television series adaptations of classic children's books. It has also been broadcast internationally on networks such as TVO / Access Alberta (Canada), France 3 (France), Antena 3 (Spain), Italia 1 (Italy), Tele 5 / tm3 (Germany), ORF1 (Austria), ABS-CBN / GMA 7 / Quality TeleVision (Philippines), Various Arab Networks (Arab World), and RTM2 (Malaysia).

The English dub for the series was handled by TVOntario from 1993-1995.
Adventure anime and manga
Television series set in the 1960s

Summary
In 1964, a thirteen-year-old British girl named Jackie Rhodes living in Kenya travels the savannah in the area of Mount Kilimanjaro, Kenya, where her father is an Animal Protection / Wildlife Officer. Jackie finds an ill animal called a bushbaby, whereupon she adopts him, calls him Murphy, and nurses him back to health. Murphy, Jackie, her family and their friends go on many adventures involving wild animals, poachers and more. When her father loses his job, the family prepares to return to England where they came from. At Mombasa, right before they are about to leave, Jackie realizes that she has lost the papers for her pet bushbaby, Murphy. She leaves the ship heading for England and it sets sail without her. Luckily, she meets Tenbo, her father's loyal African assistant. Tenbo has been spying on the export warehouse of some poachers and is now being pursued by them. In addition, a manhunt for Tenbo has begun because people think he has kidnapped Jackie. They must cross the dangerous savannah to escape the poachers and police officers chasing them. Along the way, Jackie teaches the now domesticated Murphy to survive in the wild, so that, before she leaves, she can release him in his natural habitat.

Characters

Main Characters  

AKA , is the main character of the series. She is a 13-year-old British girl who has been fascinated by Africa since childhood. She is energetic, tomboyish and has a strong sense of justice influenced by her father in protecting African wildlife. She often goes on adventures with her pet bushbaby, Murphy. She is good at horseback riding.

A young bushbaby Jackie raises to be her pet. He ran away when his home was disturbed and got injured by a vehicle Arthur was driving. He is brought home and nursed back to health by Jackie. He  becomes hyperactive and impish as he grows up. He likes mint candy but easily get intoxicated like a drunk and fall asleep. Jackie takes advantage of this and uses it as bait to calm him down.

 
 
 Arthur's assistant in protecting the wildlife sanctuary and Jackie's friend. An ex-soldier from the Royal Africa Rifle troop, and a brave warrior from a Camba tribe. He is good at playing the harmonica but he can't swim.
 Thanks to his good knowledge of nature and animals, the baby Murphy have been saved since baby Murphy did not want to drink anything but the milk of his missing mother. Jackie was in big worries and anyone could help her but Tenbo.

Secondary Characters  

Jackie's older brother. Like his father, he dreams of becoming a wildlife protection officer, but is also interested in becoming a veterinarian after he meets Hanna. He had a pet chameleon named Ben before releasing him out into the wild.

Jackie and Andrew's father. He is the wildlife protection officer patrolling the sanctuary.

Jackie and Andrew's mother. Her hobbies are drawing and painting.

 
 
 She is a helper working at the Rhodes' household.

Kate is Jackie's best friend and classmate at school.

Kate's mother. She owns and runs the coffee farm.

Henry is Laisa's younger brother and Kate's uncle. He is an engineer from an airline industry.

 
 
 Jackie's classmate at school. A mischievous boy who likes to cause trouble for Jackie and Kate.

She is the veterinarian who inspires Andrew to want to be one.

He is an archaeologist living in Kenya for more than 30 years. He travels all around Africa to find and excavate ruins of lost civilizations. He flies around these sites using his airplane, which he nicknamed Mother Goose.

Sally

Micky's little sister.

Dan Moore

 Repairman that was helping poachers for money. He has a change of heart after Jackie finds the poachers' hideout.

Lt. Robert Ireland

 A friend of Jackie's father, originally Tenbo's commanding officer in the Royal Africa Rifle troop.

Safina

 A young girl close to Jackie's age from the Maasai tribe.

Villains
Michael and John

 A duo of poachers.

List of episodes

Music
Opening Theme
"APOLLO": Eps. 01 - 22
Lyrics and composition by: Shinji Tanimura
Arrangement by: Yasuo Sakou
Song by: Yasuhide Sawa
: Eps. 23 - 40
Lyrics by: Neko Oikawa
Composition by: Masayuki Kishi
Arrangement by: Kazuo Shinoda
Song by: Satoko Yamano

Ending Theme

Lyrics and composition by: Shinji Tanimura
Arrangement by: Yasuo Sakou
Song by: Maya Okamoto

References

External links

1992 anime television series debuts
Drama anime and manga
Animated television series about mammals
Television shows based on Canadian novels
World Masterpiece Theater series